Finnic culture may refer to:

 Finnish culture, a combination of Finnic indigenous heritage with mainly Swedish cultural influence
 Estonian culture, a combination of Finnic indigenous heritage with mainly German cultural influence
 Sami culture, the traditions and heritage of the Laplanders